Željeznička Stanica Kakanj (Cyrillic: Жељезничка Станица Какањ) is a village in the municipality of Kakanj, Bosnia and Herzegovina. The name means "Kakanj railway station".

Demographics 
According to the 2013 census, its population was 529.

References

Populated places in Kakanj